Charlie Wade is a former wide receiver in the National Football League. He was drafted in the seventeenth round of the 1973 NFL Draft by the Miami Dolphins and later first played with the Chicago Bears the following year. During the 1975 NFL season he played with the Green Bay Packers before spending a season away from the NFL. He would play his final season with the Kansas City Chiefs.

References

Players of American football from Nashville, Tennessee
Chicago Bears players
Green Bay Packers players
Kansas City Chiefs players
American football wide receivers
Tennessee State Tigers football players
1950 births
Living people